Paul Sherlock (born November 1973) is a retired English professional footballer who played as a left-back, and occasionally midfielder, for Notts County and Mansfield Town.

Senior career

Notts County

On 1 July 1992, Sherlock signed a professional contract with Notts County and made 18 appearances across all competitions in almost 3 years at the club.

Mansfield Town

Having made a considerably small number of appearances for the Magpies. Sherlock was signed by Mansfield Town on 23 March 1995. He would go on to feature 43 times in all competitions over his 2 years at the club. He left the Stags on 31 May 1997 and did not go on to play for another league club.

Non-league

He played non-league football for Bedford Town and Hucknall Town.

Style of play

Sherlock was a pacey left-back who was a great tackler of the ball. Predominantly left-footed, Sherlock would run down the left wing to provide a passing option for his teammates. This meant that he was able to create many scoring opportunities for his teammates with left-footed crosses into the penalty area. He also possessed good passing and shooting ability, which paired with his good vision, would allow him to play a variety of midfield positions such as central midfield, defensive midfield and   left midfield.

Personal life

Since retiring, Sherlock earned qualifications to become a physical education teacher and worked at Hall Park Academy in Nottinghamshire. He was also deputy head teacher at the school

References

1973 births
Living people
English footballers
Notts County F.C. players
Mansfield Town F.C. players
Bedford Town F.C. players
Association football defenders
Hucknall Town F.C. players